Forebay may refer to:
Forebay (reservoir), an artificial pool of water ahead of a larger body of water
Forebay, California
Forebay, the distinctive overhangs on  Pennsylvania barns